KKTY-FM (100.1 FM) is a radio station broadcasting a Country format. Licensed to Glendo, Wyoming, United States, the station is locally owned and operated by Douglas Broadcasting, Inc and features programming from CBS News Radio and Westwood One. In addition to country music and national and international news from CBS, KKTY-FM features news and sports from the Cowboy State News Network, weather from Don Day's DayWeather, and local news updates hourly. Ag news comes from the Northern Ag Network, and Bob Kingsley counts down the Country Top 40 Sunday afternoons at 1pm.

KKTY was also the call letters Bayside High School's radio station on the comedy series Saved By The Bell episode "Save the Max." That station had frequency 98.6 FM with the slogan Tiger Beat. In the episode, characters discover old equipment in a studio and restart the station. They use the airwaves to promote their favorite restaurant to prevent its closure.

References

External links

KTY-FM